de Pra is an Italian surname. Notable people with the surname include:

Giovanni De Prà (1900–1979), Italian footballer
Leonídio de Pra, Brazilian volleyball player
Ruben De Pra (born 1980), Italian pair skater
Tommaso de Pra (born 1938), Italian cyclist

Italian-language surnames